Marriage in Small Doses is a 1939 German musical comedy film directed by Johannes Meyer and starring Leny Marenbach,  Johannes Riemann, and Ralph Arthur Roberts. It was based on a play, which was also turned into a Swedish film Variety Is the Spice of Life the same year.

Cast

References

Bibliography

External links 
 

1939 films
1939 musical comedy films
German musical comedy films
Films of Nazi Germany
1930s German-language films
Films directed by Johannes Meyer
Bavaria Film films
Cine-Allianz films
German black-and-white films
1930s German films